The 2006 Imola Superbike World Championship round was the eleventh round of the 2006 Superbike World Championship. It took place on the weekend of September 29 – October 1, 2006 at the Imola circuit.

Results

Superbike race 1 classification

Superbike race 2 classification

Supersport race classification

References
 Superbike Race 1
 Superbike Race 2
 Supersport Race

Imola
Imola Superbike